Kotraža may refer to the following places in Serbia:

 Kotraža (Lučani)
 Kotraža (Stragari)